is a Japanese naval officer.

Biography 
Kondo was born on 13 January 1966.  In April 2011 she became chief of administration at the Japan Maritime Self-Defense Force's (JMSDF) ship supply depot. In August 2012 she became head of the paymaster section at the Maritime Staff Office (MSO) and in April of the following year became vice head of finance at the MSO.  From December 2013 Kondo served as director of accounts at the JMSDF's Sasebo, Nagasaki district headquarters.  She was director of welfare at the MSO from September 2015.

In December 2016 she was promoted to the rank of rear admiral and appointed director-general of logistics in the office of the Chief of Staff, Joint Staff of the Japan Self-Defense Forces.  Kondo became, by this appointment, the first female admiral in the JMSDF.

References 

1966 births
Japan Maritime Self-Defense Force admirals
Female admirals
Living people
Female generals and flag officers of the Japan Self-Defense Forces